Amelita Alanes-Saberon (born 28 February 1952) is a Filipino sprinter. She competed in the women's 100 metres at the 1972 Summer Olympics.

References

External links

1952 births
Living people
Athletes (track and field) at the 1972 Summer Olympics
Filipino female sprinters
Olympic track and field athletes of the Philippines
Asian Games medalists in athletics (track and field)
Asian Games silver medalists for the Philippines
Asian Games bronze medalists for the Philippines
Athletes (track and field) at the 1970 Asian Games
Athletes (track and field) at the 1974 Asian Games
Athletes (track and field) at the 1978 Asian Games
Medalists at the 1970 Asian Games
Medalists at the 1978 Asian Games
Olympic female sprinters